Eddie Krueger is a retired American soccer defender who played professionally in the North American Soccer League.

In 1977, Krueger graduated from Seattle Preparatory School and signed as a seventeen-year-old with the Seattle Sounders of the North American Soccer League.  He spent the first year on the reserve team, but broke into the first team in 1978.  In 1980, the Sounders traded him to the San Diego Sockers

In 1984 Krueger played for F.C. Seattle during the 1984 F.C. Seattle Challenge Series.  This brought him to the attention of the Vancouver Whitecaps who were one of the three other teams in the challenge series.  Krueger signed with Vancouver and played two games.  After retiring from professional soccer at the end of the season, Krueger returned to Seattle where he joined the Mitre Eagles, going to the finals of the 1987 National Challenge Cup with them.  He also worked as an electrical engineer.

References

External links
 NASL stats
 Interview with Eddie Krueger

1959 births
Living people
Sportspeople from Buffalo, New York
Soccer players from New York (state)
American soccer players
American expatriate soccer players
Expatriate soccer players in Canada
Seattle Storm (soccer) players
North American Soccer League (1968–1984) players
San Diego Sockers (NASL) players
Seattle Sounders (1974–1983) players
Vancouver Whitecaps (1974–1984) players
Association football defenders